Terry William Virtue (born August 12, 1970 in Scarborough, Ontario) is a Canadian former ice hockey defenceman. He played 5 games in the National Hockey League with the Boston Bruins and New York Rangers during the 1998–99 and 1999–00 seasons. The rest of his career, which lasted from 1991 to 2007, was spent in the minor leagues.

Playing career
Virtue spent his professional career in the minor leagues, most notably for the Worcester IceCats of the American Hockey League, one of the several teams for which he served as team captain. He played five games in the National Hockey League, four in the 1998–99 season for the Boston Bruins, and one the next season for the New York Rangers.

Virtue retired from hockey after the 2006–07 season.

Coaching career
Terry has acted as an assistant coach/player for the Wheeling Nailers of the ECHL, an assistant coach for the Tri-City Americans, and an associate coach for the Owen Sound Attack. Terry has also coached for the Canon McMillian High School varsity AAA hockey team and the AAA U-14 Esmark Stars.

Personal life 
He grew up in Spruce Grove Alberta, and graduated high school at Spruce Grove Composite high in 1988 after playing his first year junior for the Hobbema Hawks.

Career statistics

Regular season and playoffs

Awards and honors

External links

1970 births
Living people
Atlanta Fire Ants players
Atlanta Knights players
Austin Ice Bats players
Binghamton Senators players
Boston Bruins players
Canadian ice hockey defencemen
Cape Breton Oilers players
Grand Rapids Griffins players
Hartford Wolf Pack players
Hobbema Hawks players
Louisville Icehawks players
New York Rangers players
Portland Winterhawks players
Providence Bruins players
Sportspeople from Scarborough, Toronto
Ice hockey people from Toronto
Springfield Falcons players
Tri-City Americans players
Undrafted National Hockey League players
Utah Grizzlies (AHL) players
Victoria Cougars (WHL) players
Wheeling Nailers players
Wheeling Thunderbirds players
Wilkes-Barre/Scranton Penguins players
Worcester IceCats players